Remigijus Šukevičius (born 3 May 1970) is a Lithuanian wrestler. He competed at the 1992 Summer Olympics and the 1996 Summer Olympics.

References

1970 births
Living people
Lithuanian male sport wrestlers
Olympic wrestlers of Lithuania
Wrestlers at the 1992 Summer Olympics
Wrestlers at the 1996 Summer Olympics
Place of birth missing (living people)
20th-century Lithuanian people